¿Quién mató a la llamita blanca? (English: Who killed the little white llama?) is a 2007 Bolivian movie that was written by Juan Cristobal Rios Violand and directed by Rodrigo Bellott. 
The film is both a celebration and a parody of Bolivian customs, countryside and culture, with a serious message about the endemic poverty in Bolivia.

Plot
Jacinto and Domitila are two indigenous Bolivians who are both happily married and the most notorious criminals in the country. They accept a job to transport 50 kg of cocaine to the Brazilian border. They disguise themselves as a farming couple expecting a baby, with the cocaine hidden in Domitilas false pregnant belly.

The man behind the smuggling operation is El Negro, an American who has secrets of his own. On the trail of Jacinto and Domitilia are two anti-narcotics officers, who turn out to have immoral and illegal sides of their own.

The film follows the two protagonists through jungles, cities and rural landscapes as they outwit their pursuers.

Cast
 Erika Andia as Domitila
 Miguel Valverde as Jacinto
 Pablo Fernandez as Chicho
 Augustin Mendieta as Perucho
 Guery Sandoval as Narrator

Crew
 Directed by Rodrigo Bellott
 Written by Juan Cristobal Rios Violand

Release
The film premiered on  March 15 2007 in Argentina

Reception
When released in Bolivia, the film broke all box office records and became the most infringed DVD in the country, playing frequently in the restaurants and buses that once showcased standard Hollywood fare.

References

External links
 ¿Quién mató a la llamita blanca? at the Internet Movie Database

Bolivian comedy films
2007 films